Docherty may refer to:

 Docherty (surname)
 Docherty (novel), by William McIlvanney (1975)
 Glen Docherty, a glen in Wester Ross, Scotland